Comte Yvan du Monceau de Bergendal (10 December 1915 – 10 December 1984) was a Belgian aviator and World War II flying ace.

Bibliography

1915 births
1984 deaths
Belgian World War II flying aces
British emigrants to Belgium